Thomas Gregory Stephens  (born 15 November 1951 in Sydney, New South Wales Australia) is a former Australian parliamentarian.

Early life and career
Youngest son to John Joseph and Ellen Genevieve Stephens six children; five sons and one daughter. The family were living at the time on the Hawkesbury River at Brooklyn, New South Wales. Tom was educated by the Sisters of Mercy at their convent school in Parkes, NSW; then at Campbelltown NSW by the Good Samaritan Sisters before his secondary schooling at St Gregory's Marist Brothers Agricultural College in Campbelltown. After completing his secondary schooling, Tom entered St Colomba's Seminary in Springwood where he commenced studies for the Catholic Priesthood. After undertaking studies for a BA at the ANU, Tom continued on to Theology Studies at Manly's St Patrick's College but did not complete those studies for priesthood. Tom had been working closely with Aboriginal people in Redfern, assisting Father Ted Kennedy and Aboriginal leader Shirley Smith, known as Mum Shirl. This work led Tom to the Kimberley region of WA where he became closely involved with many indigenous communities across the region and was centrally involved in establishing the Kimberley Land Council in 1978. Tom became a Western Australian state parliamentarian at age 31; he served as a Labor Party member of the Parliament of Western Australia from 1982 to 2013; serving first in the Legislative Council from 1982 to 2004, and then in the Legislative Assembly from 2005 until his retirement on 9 March 2013. Tom served first as a minister, albeit briefly, in the Lawrence Labor Government from 1992 to 1993 and then in the Gallop government from 2001 to 2004.

Stephens was first elected to the Legislative Council at a 1982 by-election for the seat of North Province, sparked by the resignation of Liberal MLC Bill Withers. He was re-elected for North Province in 1983, and then in 1989 for the redistributed seat of the new Mining and Pastoral electoral region. He was re-elected in Mining and Pastoral in 1993, 1996 and 2001.

Stephens served as a parliamentary secretary and as a minister in the Lawrence government in the 1990s; he was Leader of the Labor Opposition in the Legislative Council until the 2001 election of the new Labor government under Geoff Gallop, when he was elected into the ministry. He initially served as Minister for Housing and Works, and then later added Local Government and Regional Development to his portfolios. He also held the portfolios of the Kimberley, Pilbara and Gascoyne, Regional Development and Heritage.

In late 2004, the Labor candidate for the rural seat of Kalgoorlie for the 2004 federal election, Kevin Richards, died suddenly during the final stages of that Federal campaign. Stephens, who was already preselected for the Legislative Assembly seat of Central Kimberley-Pilbara, was drafted as a last-minute replacement candidate for the Federal seat of Kalgoorlie. Stephens duly resigned from the WA State Cabinet and the WA Legislative Council, nominated and ran for that Federal seat; he was defeated at that contest by incumbent Liberal MP Barry Haase. Stephens subsequently contested and won the WA state seat of Central Kimberley Pilbara at the 2005 election. He chaired the Education and Health Standing Committee until September 2008 and was elected as Member for Pilbara at the October 2008 elections and served as a member of the Standing Committee on Community Development & Justice. Stephens served on the Boards of Good to Great Schools Australia (Noel Pearson's Education Reform agency), DSF-SPELD (WA), Lost & Found Opera, IBN and previously served on the Board of Yindjibarndi CCL; he sings (as a bass) with the University of Western Australia Choral Society and is an avid cyclist.

Stephens was awarded the Medal of the Order of Australia (OAM) in the 2014 Australia Day Honours for "service to Indigenous affairs, and to the Parliament of Western Australia".

References

External links
 http://www.luccagrapevine.com/july2016/francigena.pdf

1951 births
Living people
Members of the Western Australian Legislative Assembly
Members of the Western Australian Legislative Council
Australian Labor Party members of the Parliament of Western Australia
21st-century Australian politicians
Recipients of the Medal of the Order of Australia